Han Ki-Joo (Hangul: 한기주, Hanja: 韓基周) (born April 29, 1987 in Gwangju, South Korea) is a right-handed relief pitcher who plays for the Samsung Lions of the KBO League.

Amateur career
Han attended Dongsung High School in Gwangju, South Korea. In 2004, he was selected for the South Korea national junior team that won the bronze medal at the 2004 World Junior Baseball Championship in Taiwan. Han, the youngest player on the South Korean team roster, pitched 7 shutout innings, struck out 12, and allowed only 3 hits to win over Australia in the round-robin.

In 2005, he was selected for the national junior team again, along with Kim Kwang-Hyun and Ryu Hyun-Jin, and participated in the 6th Asian Junior Baseball Championship held in Seoul, South Korea. However, his performance was very disappointing, pitching to a 6.28 ERA in 3 games (1 start).

Notable international careers

Professional career
Han debuted with the 2006 Kia Tigers and finished with a record of 11-10, a 3.26 ERA and 78 strikeouts in 44 games. As a rookie starter, he had a fine season, but his stats were dwarfed by those of Ryu Hyun-Jin who became the only player in KBO history to earn both the Rookie of The Year and MVP awards in the same season.

After the season, Han made a transition to the bullpen, filling a void as Kia's closer down the stretch.

Han had his best KBO season as a closer in 2008 when he was ranked third in the league with 26 saves, posting a 1.71 ERA. He was regarded as an unreliable closer, however, as he didn't overwhelm hitters. During the 2008 Beijing Olympics Baseball tournament in August 2008, Han earned the notoriety of being a "choker", "suspense writer", and subject to many other unflattering nicknames due to his failure to close out games in the late innings.  Usually a solid closer for his Pro team, Han blew the lead in the 9th inning of the game against the United States, then proceeded to make things interesting once again against Japan a few days later before being yanked with runners on 2nd and 3rd.  Han was given yet another chance against Chinese Taipei, which he also subsequently failed to close.  However, Korea won all of the aforementioned games en route to winning the gold medal with a perfect record, although Han was not given the chance to pitch again in the tournament after the game against Chinese Taipei.

In May 2009, after blowing four saves within one month with a 6.08 ERA, Han was demoted from his role as Tigers closer, losing the job to Yoon Suk-Min. After finishing the 2009 season with a record of 4-5 and an ERA of 4.24 as a setup man, he required Tommy John surgery and subsequently missed most of the 2010 season.

He suffered injury in 2011, 2012. He just played 28 innings for 2 years. In 2013, he surgery shoulder and rehabilitation 2 years.

Notable international careers

Filmography

Television show

References

External links
 Profile and stats on the KBO official website

Baseball players at the 2008 Summer Olympics
Olympic gold medalists for South Korea
Olympic baseball players of South Korea
Samsung Lions players
KBO League pitchers
South Korean baseball players
1987 births
Living people
Olympic medalists in baseball
Medalists at the 2008 Summer Olympics
Sportspeople from Gwangju